Cham Shateh may refer to:

Cham Shateh-ye Sofla